, Plants of the World Online accepted 267 species of Erysimum. Some taxa regarded as subspecies by Plants of the World Online are treated as full species by Flora Iberica, and are also listed below.

A

Erysimum absconditum O.E.Schulz
Erysimum aciphyllum Boiss.
Erysimum acrotonum Polatschek & Rech.f.
Erysimum adcumbens (Boiss.) Polatschek
Erysimum afghanicum Kitam.
Erysimum aitchisonii O.E.Schulz
Erysimum aksaricum Pavlov
Erysimum alaicum Novopokr. ex Nikitina
Erysimum altaicum C.A.Mey.
Erysimum amasianum Hausskn. & Bornm.
Erysimum ammophilum A.Heller
Erysimum anceps Steven ex Ledeb.
Erysimum andrzejowskianum DC.
Erysimum apenninum Peccenini & Polatschek
Erysimum arbuscula (Lowe) Snogerup
Erysimum arenicola S.Watson
Erysimum argyrocarpum N.Busch
Erysimum arkansanum Nutt.
Erysimum armeniacum (Sims) J.Gay
Erysimum artwinense N.Busch
Erysimum asperulum Boiss. & Heldr.
Erysimum asperum (Nutt.) DC.
Erysimum aucherianum J.Gay
Erysimum aureum M.Bieb.
Erysimum aurigeranum Jeanb. & Timb.-Lagr.
Erysimum aznavourii Polatschek

B

Erysimum babadagense Prima
Erysimum babataghi Korsh.
Erysimum baeticum (Heywood) Polatschek
Erysimum bagcii Yild.
Erysimum bastetanum (Blanca & C.Morales) Lorite, Perfectti & J.M.Gómez
Erysimum baytopiae Yild.
Erysimum belvederense Polatschek
Erysimum benthamii Monnet
Erysimum bicolor (Hornem.) DC.
Erysimum boissieri Polatschek
Erysimum bonannianum C.Presl
Erysimum boreale (C.A.Mey. ex Rupr.) Trautv.
Erysimum boryanum Boiss.
Erysimum brevistylum Sommier & Levier
Erysimum brulloi G.Ferro
Erysimum bulgaricum (Velen.) Ancev & Polatschek
Erysimum burnatii Vidal

C

Erysimum caboverdeanum (A.Chev.) Sunding
Erysimum caespitosum DC.
Erysimum californicum Greene
Erysimum callicarpum Lipsky
Erysimum calycinum Griseb.
Erysimum candicum Snogerup
Erysimum canum (Piller & Mitterp.) Polatschek
Erysimum capitatum (Douglas) Greene
Erysimum carium Boiss.
Erysimum carniolicum Doell.
Erysimum caucasicum Trautv.
Erysimum cazorlense (Heywood) Holub, syn. E. myriophyllum subsp. cazorlense (Heywood) Polatschek
Erysimum chazarjurti N.Busch
Erysimum cheiranthoides L.
Erysimum × cheiri (L.) Crantz
Erysimum coarctatum Fernald
Erysimum collinum (M.Bieb.) Andrz. ex DC.
Erysimum collisparsum Jord., syn. E. ruscinonense Jord.
Erysimum commatum Pancic
Erysimum concinnum Eastw.
Erysimum confine Jord.
Erysimum contractum Sommier & Levier
Erysimum corinthium (Boiss.) Wettst.
Erysimum crassicaule (Boiss.) Boiss.
Erysimum crassipes Fisch. & C.A.Mey.
Erysimum crassistylum C.Presl
Erysimum crepidifolium Rchb.
Erysimum cretaceum (Trautv.) Schmalh.
Erysimum creticum Boiss. & Heldr.
Erysimum croaticum Polatschek
Erysimum cuspidatum (M.Bieb.) DC.
Erysimum cyaneum Popov
Erysimum czernjajevi N.Busch

D–E

Erysimum damirliense Moazzeni & Mahmoodi
Erysimum deflexum Hook.f. & Thomson
Erysimum degenianum Azn.
Erysimum diffusum Ehrh.
Erysimum dincii Yild.
Erysimum dirmilense Yild. & Dinç
Erysimum drenowskii Degen
Erysimum duranii Yild.
Erysimum duriaei Boiss.
Erysimum echinellum Hand.-Mazz.
Erysimum eginense Hausskn. ex Bornm.
Erysimum ehrendorferi Polatschek
Erysimum elbrusense Boiss.
Erysimum elymaiticum Mozaff.
Erysimum erolii Yild.
Erysimum erosum O.E.Schulz
Erysimum etnense Jord.
Erysimum euphraticum Polatschek
Erysimum evinense Polatschek
Erysimum exaltatum Andrz. ex Besser

F–G

Erysimum favargeri Polatschek
Erysimum fitzii Polatschek, syn. E. nevadense subsp. fitzii (Polatschek) P.W.Ball
Erysimum flavum (Georgi) Bobrov
Erysimum forrestii (W.W.Sm.) Polatschek
Erysimum franciscanum Rossbach
Erysimum friedrichii Polatschek
Erysimum frigidum Boiss. & Hausskn.
Erysimum froehneri Polatschek
Erysimum funiculosum Hook.f. & Thomson
Erysimum geisleri Polatschek
Erysimum gelidum Bunge
Erysimum ghaznicum Cullen & Rech.f.
Erysimum ghiesbreghtii Donn.Sm.
Erysimum gladiiferum Boiss. & Hausskn.
Erysimum gomez-campoi Polatschek, syn. E. nevadense subsp. gomez-campoi (Polatschek) P.W.Ball
Erysimum gorbeanum Polatschek, syn. E. duriaei subsp. gorbeanum (Polatschek) P.W.Ball
Erysimum graecum Boiss. & Heldr.
Erysimum grandiflorum Desf.
Erysimum griffithianum Boiss.
Erysimum griffithii (Hook.f. & Thomson) Jafri
Erysimum guneri Yild.
Erysimum gypsaceum Botch. & Vved.

H–J

Erysimum hajastanicum Wissjul. & Bordz.
Erysimum handel-mazzettii Polatschek
Erysimum hedgeanum Al-Shehbaz
Erysimum hezarense Moazzeni
Erysimum hirschfeldioides Boiss. & Hausskn.
Erysimum horizontale Candargy
Erysimum huber-morathii Polatschek
Erysimum hungaricum Zapal.
Erysimum ibericum (Adam) DC.
Erysimum idae Polatschek
Erysimum ikizdereense Yild.
Erysimum incanum Kunze
Erysimum inconspicuum (S.Watson) MacMill.
Erysimum inense N.Busch
Erysimum insubricum Peccenini & Polatschek
Erysimum insulare (Greene) Greene
Erysimum iraqense Polatschek
Erysimum ischnostylum Freyn & Sint.
Erysimum jacquemoudii Yild.
Erysimum janchenii Fritsch
Erysimum jugicola Jord.

K–L

Erysimum kamelinii D.A.German
Erysimum kartalkayaense Yild.
Erysimum kazachstanicum Botsch.
Erysimum kerbabaevii Kurbanov & Gudkova
Erysimum ketenoglui Yild.
Erysimum koelzii Polatschek & Rech.f.
Erysimum korabense Kümmerle & Jáv.
Erysimum kostkae Polatschek
Erysimum kotschyanum J.Gay
Erysimum krendlii Polatschek
Erysimum krynitzkii Bordz.
Erysimum krynkense Lavrenko
Erysimum kuemmerlei Jáv.
Erysimum kurdicum Boiss. & Hausskn.
Erysimum kykkoticum Hadjik. & Alziar
Erysimum lagascae Rivas Goday & Bellot
Erysimum ledebourii D.A.German
Erysimum leptophyllum (M.Bieb.) Andrz. ex DC.
Erysimum leptostylum DC.
Erysimum leucanthemum (Stephan ex Willd.) B.Fedtsch.
Erysimum ligusticum Peccenini & Polatschek
Erysimum lilacinum Steinb.
Erysimum limprichtii O.E.Schulz
Erysimum linariifolium Tausch
Erysimum linifolium (Pers.) J.Gay
Erysimum lycaonicum (Hand.-Mazz.) Hub.-Mor.

M

Erysimum macilentum Bunge
Erysimum macrospermum Cullen & Rech.f.
Erysimum macrostigma Boiss.
Erysimum maderense Polatschek
Erysimum majellense Polatschek
Erysimum maremmanum Peccenini & Polatschek
Erysimum marschallianum Andrz. ex DC.
Erysimum × marshallii (Henfr.) Bois
Erysimum mediohispanicum Polatschek, syn. E. nevadense subsp. mediohispanicum (Polatschek) P.W.Ball
Erysimum melicentae Dunn
Erysimum menziesii (Hook.) Wettst.
Erysimum merxmuelleri Polatschek, syn. E. nevadense subsp. merxmuelleri (Polatschek) P.W.Ball
Erysimum metlesicsii Polatschek
Erysimum meyerianum (Rupr.) N.Busch
Erysimum mongolicum D.A.German
Erysimum montosicola Jord.
Erysimum munzuriense Polatschek
Erysimum mutabile Boiss. & Heldr.
Erysimum myriophyllum Lange

N–O

Erysimum nabievii Adylov
Erysimum nanum Boiss. & Hohen.
Erysimum nasturtioides Boiss. & Hausskn.
Erysimum naxense Snogerup
Erysimum nemrutdaghense Mutlu
Erysimum nevadense Reut.
Erysimum nuristanicum Polatschek & Rech.f.
Erysimum occidentale (S.Watson) B.L.Rob.
Erysimum ochroleucum (Haller f. ex Schleich.) DC.
Erysimum odoratum Ehrh.
Erysimum oleifolium J.Gay
Erysimum olympicum Boiss.

P–Q

Erysimum pachycarpum Hook.f. & Thomson
Erysimum pacificum (E.Sheld.) Polatschek
Erysimum parryoides (Kurz) Wettst.
Erysimum pectinatum Bory & Chaub.
Erysimum penyalarense (Pau) Polatschek
Erysimum perenne (S.Watson ex Coville) Abrams
Erysimum perofskianum Fisch. & C.A.Mey.
Erysimum persepolitanum Boiss.
Erysimum pignattii Peccenini & Polatschek
Erysimum pirinicum Ancev & Polatschek
Erysimum polatschekii Moazzeni, Assadi & Al-Shehbaz
Erysimum popovii Rothm.
Erysimum portugalense Polatschek
Erysimum pseudoatticum Ancev & Polatschek
Erysimum pseudocheiri Boiss.
Erysimum pseudocuspidatum Polatschek
Erysimum pseudopurpureum Polatschek
Erysimum pseudorhaeticum Polatschek
Erysimum pulchellum (Willd.) J.Gay
Erysimum purpureum J.Gay
Erysimum pusillum Bory & Chaub.
Erysimum quadrangulum Desf.

R–S

Erysimum raineri Polatschek
Erysimum raulinii Boiss.
Erysimum redowskii Weinm.
Erysimum repandum L.
Erysimum rhaeticum (Schleich. ex Hornem.) DC.
Erysimum rhodium Snogerup
Erysimum riphaeanum Lorite, Abdelaziz, Muñoz-Pajares, Perfectti & J.M.Gómez
Erysimum rizeense Yild.
Erysimum robustum D.Don
Erysimum rondae Polatschek, syn. E. nevadense subsp. rondae (Polatschek) P.W.Ball
Erysimum roseum (Maxim.) Polatschek
Erysimum salangense Polatschek & Rech.f.
Erysimum samarkandicum Popov
Erysimum scabrum DC.
Erysimum schlagintweitianum O.E.Schulz
Erysimum scoparium (Brouss. ex Willd.) Wettst.
Erysimum seipkae Polatschek
Erysimum semperflorens (Schousb.) Wettst.
Erysimum senoneri (Reut.) Wettst.
Erysimum serpentinicum Polatschek
Erysimum siliculosum (M.Bieb.) DC.
Erysimum sintenisianum Bornm.
Erysimum sisymbrioides C.A.Mey.
Erysimum sivasicum Yild.
Erysimum slavjankae Ancev & Polatschek
Erysimum smyrnaeum Boiss. & Balansa
Erysimum sorgerae Polatschek
Erysimum spetae Polatschek
Erysimum stenophyllum Boiss. ex Polatschek
Erysimum strictisiliquum N.Busch
Erysimum strophades Boiss.
Erysimum substrigosum (Rupr.) N.Busch
Erysimum subulatum J.Gay
Erysimum suffrutescens (Abrams) Rossbach
Erysimum sylvestre (Crantz) Scop.
Erysimum szowitsianum Boiss.

T–Z

Erysimum talijevii (Klokov) Mosyakin
Erysimum tenellum DC.
Erysimum teppneri Polatschek
Erysimum teretifolium Eastw.
Erysimum thyrsoideum Boiss.
Erysimum tuteliae Yild.
Erysimum ucranicum J.Gay
Erysimum uncinatifolium Boiss. & A.Huet
Erysimum vassilczenkoi Polatschek
Erysimum verrucosum Boiss. & Gaill.
Erysimum violascens Popov
Erysimum virescens (Webb ex Christ) Wettst.
Erysimum virgatum Roth
Erysimum vitekii Polatschek
Erysimum vitellinum Popov
Erysimum vuralii Yild.
Erysimum wardii Polatschek
Erysimum wilczekianum Braun-Blanq. & Maire
Erysimum witmannii Zaw.
Erysimum yaltirikii Yild.
Erysimum yildirimlii Dinç
Erysimum zeybekianum Yild.

References

Erysimum
Erysimum species